The Four Modernizations (simplified Chinese: 四个现代化; traditional Chinese: 四個現代化) were goals first set forth by Deng Xiaoping to strengthen the fields of agriculture, industry, defense, and science and technology in China. The Four Modernizations were adopted as a means of rejuvenating China's economy in 1977, following the death of Mao Zedong, and later were among the defining features of Deng Xiaoping's tenure as the paramount leader of China. At the beginning of "Reform and Opening-up", Deng further proposed the idea of "xiaokang" or "Moderately prosperous society" in 1979.

Summary
They were introduced as early as January 1963: at the Conference on Scientific and Technological Work held in Shanghai in January 1963, Zhou Enlai called for professionals in the sciences to realize "the Four Modernizations." In February 1963, at the National Conference on Agricultural Science and Technology Work, Nie Rongzhen specifically referred to the Four Modernizations as comprising agriculture, industry, national defense, and science and technology. The Cultural Revolution prevented and delayed implementation of the Four Modernizations for years. In 1975, in one of his last public acts, Zhou Enlai made another pitch for the Four Modernizations at the 4th National People's Congress. 

After Zhou's death and Mao's soon thereafter, Hua Guofeng assumed control of the party in 1976. Hua had the leadership of the Cultural Revolution arrested. Known as the Gang of Four, their arrest marked the end of the Cultural Revolution. This event enabled the enactment of the Four Modernizations. By 1977 all entities in every sector and at every level of society were focused on implementing the Four Modernizations. One core tenet was the rejection of the previously long-held concept known as the "iron rice bowl". 

The new idea was that all workers should not be paid the same, but rather, paid according to their productivity. The thinking was that in order to be a consumer society, China would need to be a producing society. In December 1978 at the 3rd Plenum of the 11th Central Committee, Deng Xiaoping announced the official launch of the Four Modernizations, formally marking the beginning of the reform.

The science and technology modernization, although understood by Chinese leaders as being key to the transformation of industry and the economy, proved to be more of a theoretical goal than an achievable objective. This was primarily due to decades-long isolation of Chinese scientists from the international community, outmoded and outdated universities, and an overall lack of access to advanced scientific equipment, information technology, and management know-how. 

Recognizing the need for technical assistance to spur this most important modernization, the Chinese Government elicited the support of the United Nations Development Programme (UNDP) in the fall of 1978 to scope out and provide financial resources for the implementation of an initial complement of targeted projects. The initial projects from 1979 to 1984 included the establishment of overseas on-the-job training and academic programs, set-up of information processing centers at key government units, and the development of methods to make informed decisions within the Chinese context based on market principles. The key advisor to the Chinese Government on behalf of the UNDP was Jack Fensterstock of the United States. This first technical assistance effort (CPR/79-001) by the UNDP led to the entry of large-scale multilateral funding agencies including the World Bank and the Asian Development Bank.

Controversy
On December 5, 1978, former red guard Wei Jingsheng posted "democracy" as the Fifth Modernization on the Democracy Wall in Beijing. He was arrested a few months later and jailed for 15 years until 1993.

See also

Deng Xiaoping Theory
Xiaokang
Shenzhen speed

References

Further reading

 - Read online, registration required

Modernizations
Chinese words and phrases
Economic history of the People's Republic of China
Ideology of the Chinese Communist Party
1963 neologisms